The 2021 St. Louis Cardinals season was the 140th for the St. Louis Cardinals of the Major League Baseball (MLB), a franchise in St. Louis, Missouri. It also was the 130th season for the Cardinals in the National League (NL), and their 16th at Busch Stadium III. They advanced to the playoffs but lost to the Los Angeles Dodgers in the 2021 National League Wild Card Game. The season included a 17-game winning streak in September, which was the longest in franchise history.

Regular season

Season standings

National League Central

National League playoff standings

Record vs. opponents

Game log 

|- style="background:#bbffbb;"
| 1 || April 1 || @ Reds || 11–6 || Gallegos (1–0) || Castillo (0–1) || — || 12,695 || 1–0 || W1
|- style="background:#ffbbbb;"
| 2 || April 3 || @ Reds || 6–9 || Mahle (1–0) || Wainwright (0–1) || — || 12,213 || 1–1 || L1
|- style="background:#ffbbbb;"
| 3 || April 4 || @ Reds || 1–12 || Hoffman (1–0) || Martínez (0–1) || — || 11,629 || 1–2 || L2
|- style="background:#bbffbb;"
| 4 || April 5 || @ Marlins || 4–1 || Ponce de Leon (1–0) || Rogers (0–1) || Reyes (1) || 4,605 || 2–2 || W1
|- style="background:#bbffbb;"
| 5 || April 6 || @ Marlins || 4–2 || Helsley (1–0) || Alcántara (0–1) || Reyes (2) || 4,982 || 3–2 || W2
|- style="background:#bbffbb;"
| 6 || April 7 || @ Marlins || 7–0 || Flaherty (1–0) || López (0–1) || — || 5,244 || 4–2 || W3
|- style="background:#bbffbb;"
| 7 || April 8 || Brewers || 3–1 || Gallegos (2–0) || Rasmussen (0–1) || Reyes (3) || 13,328 || 5–2 || W4
|- style="background:#ffbbbb;"
| 8 || April 10 || Brewers || 5–9 || Houser (1–1) || Martínez (0–2) || — || 13,304 || 5–3 || L1
|- style="background:#ffbbbb;"
| 9 || April 11 || Brewers || 3–9 || Anderson (1–1) || Ponce de Leon (1–1) || — || 13,176 || 5–4 || L2
|- style="background:#ffbbbb;"
| 10 || April 12 || Nationals || 2–5 || Finnegan (1–0) || Gant (0–1) || Hand (1) || 12,894 || 5–5 || L3
|- style="background:#bbffbb;"
| 11 || April 13 || Nationals || 14–3 || Flaherty (2–0) || Strasburg (0–1) || — || 12,714 || 6–5 || W1
|- style="background:#ffbbbb;"
| 12 || April 14 || Nationals || 0–6 ||Ross (1–0) || Wainwright (0–2)|| — || 13,206|| 6–6 ||L1
|- style="background:#ffbbbb;"
| 13 || April 16 || @ Phillies || 2–9 || Eflin (1–0) || Martínez (0–3) || — || 10,842 || 6–7 || L2
|- style="background:#bbffbb;"
| 14 || April 17 || @ Phillies || 9–4 || Helsley (2–0) || Moore (0–1) || — || 10,890 || 7–7 || W1
|- style="background:#ffbbbb;"
| 15 || April 18 || @ Phillies || 0–2 || Nola (1–1) || Gant (0–2) || — || 10,876 || 7–8 || L1
|- style="background:#bbffbb;"
| 16 || April 19 || @ Nationals || 12–5 || Flaherty (3–0) || Ross (1–1) || — || 7,542 || 8–8 || W1
|- style="background:#ffbbbb;"
| 17 || April 20 || @ Nationals || 2–3 || Hudson (2–0) || Gallegos (2–1) || Hand (2) || 8,418 || 8–9 || L1
|- style="background:#ffbbbb;"
| 18 || April 21 || @ Nationals || 0–1 || Scherzer (1–1) || Martínez (0–4) || Hand (3) || 7,769 || 8–10 || L2
|- style="background:#bbffbb;"
| 19 || April 23 || Reds || 5–4 || Kim (1–0) || Gray (0–1) || Reyes (4) || 13,196 || 9–10 || W1
|- style="background:#bbffbb;"
| 20 || April 24 || Reds || 2–0 || Gant (1–2) || Miley (2–2) || Gallegos (1) || 13,176 || 10–10 || W2
|- style="background:#bbffbb;"
| 21 || April 25 || Reds || 5–2 || Flaherty (4–0) || Castillo (1–2) || Reyes (5) || 13,348 || 11–10 || W3
|- style="background:#ffbbbb;" 
| 22 || April 26 || Phillies || 1–2 || Wheeler (2–2) || Wainwright (0–3) || Neris (4) || 12,866 || 11–11 || L1
|- style="background:#bbffbb;" 
| 23 || April 27 || Phillies || 5–2 || Martínez (1–4) || Eflin (1–1) || Reyes (6) || 12,895 || 12–11 || W1
|- style="background:#ffbbbb;" 
| 24 || April 28 || Phillies || 3–5 || Kintzler (1–0) || Cabrera (0–1) || Neris (5) || 12,701 || 12–12 || L1
|- style="background:#bbffbb;"
| 25 || April 29 || Phillies || 4–3  || Reyes (1–0) || Hale (0–1) || — || 13,159 || 13–12 || W1
|- style="background:#bbffbb;" 
| 26 || April 30 || @ Pirates || 7–3 || Gant (2–2) || Brubaker (2–2) || — || 5,953 || 14–12 || W2
|-

|- style="background:#bbffbb;"
| 27 || May 1 || @ Pirates || 12–5 || Flaherty (5–0) || Cahill (1–3) || — || 7,331 || 15–12 || W3
|- style="background:#bbffbb;" 
| 28 || May 2 || @ Pirates || 3–0 || Martínez (2–4) || Crowe (0–1) || Reyes (7) || 7,343 || 16–12 || W4
|- style="background:#bbffbb;" 
| 29 || May 3 || Mets || 6–5 || Wainwright (1–3) || Lucchesi (0–2) || Reyes (8) || 12,686 || 17–12 || W5
|- style="background:#bbbbbb;" 
| — || May 4 || Mets || colspan=8 | Postponed (rain, makeup May 5)
|- style="background:#bbffbb;" 
| 30 || May 5  || Mets || 4–1  || Helsley (3–0) || Stroman (3–3) || Reyes (9) || N/A || 18–12 || W6
|- style="background:#ffbbbb;" 
| 31 || May 5  || Mets || 2–7  || Yamamoto (1–0) || Oviedo (0–1) || — || 13,187 || 18–13 || L1
|- style="background:#ffbbbb;" 
| 32 || May 6 || Mets || 1–4 || Walker (2–1) || Gant (2–3) || Díaz (4) || 12,939 || 18–14 || L2
|- style="background:#bbffbb;" 
| 33 || May 7 || Rockies || 5–0 || Flaherty (6–0) || Gomber (2–4) || — || 13,435 || 19–14 || W1
|- style="background:#bbffbb;" 
| 34 || May 8 || Rockies || 9–8 || Martínez (3–4) || Gonzalez (1–1) || Reyes (10) || 13,390 || 20–14 || W2
|- style="background:#bbffbb;" 
| 35 || May 9 || Rockies || 2–0 || Wainwright (2–3) || Márquez (1–4) || Helsley (1) || 13,380 || 21–14 || W3
|- style="background:#bbffbb;" 
| 36 || May 11 || @ Brewers || 6–1  || Reyes (2–0) || Boxberger (0–1) || — || 10,595 || 22–14 || W4
|- style="background:#ffbbbb;" 
| 37 || May 12 || @ Brewers || 1–4 || Williams (1–0) || Helsley (3–1) || Hader (8) || 10,226 || 22–15 || L1
|- style="background:#bbffbb;" 
| 38 || May 13 || @ Brewers || 2–0 || Flaherty (7–0) || Burnes (2–3) || Reyes (11) || 10,554 || 23–15 || W1
|- style="background:#ffbbbb;"
| 39 || May 14 || @ Padres || 4–5 || Musgrove (3–4) || Oviedo (0–2) || Melancon (13) || 15,250 || 23–16 || L1
|- style="background:#ffbbbb;" 
| 40 || May 15 || @ Padres (FS1) || 3–13 || Díaz (2–0) || Wainwright (2–4) || — || 15,250 || 23–17 || L2
|- style="background:#ffbbbb;" 
| 41 || May 16 || @ Padres (ESPN)|| 3–5 || Lamet (1–0) || Kim (1–1) || Melancon (14) || 15,250 || 23–18 || L3
|- style="background:#bbffbb;" 
| 42 || May 18 || Pirates || 5–2 || Gant (3–3) || Brubaker (3–3) || Reyes (12) || 14,005 || 24–18 || W1
|- style="background:#bbffbb;" 
| 43 || May 19 || Pirates || 8–5 || Flaherty (8–0) || Cahill (1–5) || Reyes (13) || 14,677 || 25–18 || W2
|- style="background:#ffbbbb;" 
| 44 || May 21 || Cubs || 3–12 || Hendricks (4–4) || Helsley (3–2) || — || 24,282 || 25–19 || L1
|- style="background:#bbffbb;" 
| 45 || May 22 || Cubs (Fox)|| 2–1 || Cabrera (1–1) || Alzolay (2–4) || Reyes (14) || 26,027 || 26–19 || W1
|- style="background:#ffbbbb;" 
| 46 || May 23 || Cubs (ESPN) || 1–2  || Kimbrel (1–2) || Reyes (2–1) || — || 24,082|| 26–20 || L1
|- style="background:#ffbbbb;" 
| 47 || May 24 || @ White Sox || 1–5 || Lynn (5–1) || Kim (1–2) || — || 14,629 || 26–21 || L2
|- style="background:#ffbbbb;" 
| 48 || May 25 || @ White Sox || 3–8 || Giolito (4–4) || Flaherty (8–1) || Hendriks (10) || 16,380 || 26–22 || L3
|- style="background:#bbffbb;" 
| 49 || May 26 || @ White Sox || 4–0 || Gant (4–3) || Rodón (5–2) || — || 14,791 || 27–22 || W1
|- style="background:#bbffbb;"
| 50 || May 27 || @ Diamondbacks || 5–4  || Reyes (3–1) || Crichton (0–4) || Ponce de Leon (1) || 8,951 || 28–22 || W2
|- style="background:#bbffbb;"
| 51 || May 28 || @ Diamondbacks || 8–6 || Woodford (1–0) || Bumgarner (4–5) || Ponce de Leon (2) || 11,581 || 29–22 || W3
|- style="background:#bbffbb;" 
| 52 || May 29 || @ Diamondbacks || 7–4 || Wainwright (3–4) || Frankoff (0–2) || Reyes (15) || 17,834 || 30–22 || W4
|- style="background:#ffbbbb;"
| 53 || May 30 || @ Diamondbacks || 2–9 || Peacock (2–1) || Kim (1–3) || Smith (1) || 16,681 || 30–23 || L1
|- style="background:#ffbbbb;"
| 54 || May 31 || @ Dodgers || 4–9 || Bauer (6–3) || Helsley (3–3) || — || 18,071 || 30–24 || L2
|-

|- style="background:#bbffbb;" 
| 55 || June 1 || @ Dodgers || 3–2 || Gallegos (3–1) || Treinen (1–2) || Reyes (16) || 15,683 || 31–24 || W1
|- style="background:#ffbbbb;" 
| 56 || June 2 || @ Dodgers || 3–14 || Buehler (4–0) || Martínez (3–5) || — || 15,889 || 31–25 || L1
|- style="background:#ffbbbb;" 
| 57 || June 3 || Reds || 2–4 || Gutiérrez (1–1) || Wainwright (3–5) || Sims (4) || 15,327 || 31–26 || L2
|- style="background:#ffbbbb;" 
| 58 || June 4 || Reds || 4–6 || Castillo (2–8) || Kim (1–4) || Feliz (1) || 22,756 || 31–27 || L3
|- style="background:#ffbbbb;" 
| 59 || June 5 || Reds || 2–5 || Mahle (5–2) || Helsley (3–4) || Sims (5) || 23,365 || 31–28 || L4
|- style="background:#ffbbbb;" 
| 60 || June 6 || Reds || 7–8 || Hembree (1–1) || Reyes (3–2) || Sims (6) || 21,152 || 31–29 || L5
|- style="background:#ffbbbb;"
| 61 || June 8 || Indians || 1–10 || Bieber (7–3) || Martínez (3–6) || — || 16,178 || 31–30 || L6
|- style="background:#bbffbb;" 
| 62 || June 9 || Indians || 8–2 || Wainwright (4–5) || Mejía (0–1) || — || 16,331 || 32–30 || W1
|- style="background:#ffbbbb;"
| 63 || June 11 || @ Cubs || 5–8 || Nance (1–0) || Cabrera (1–2) || Kimbrel (16) || 35,112 || 32–31 || L1
|- style="background:#ffbbbb;" 
| 64 || June 12 || @ Cubs (Fox)|| 2–7 || Hendricks (8–4) || Gant (4–4) || Kimbrel (17) || 39,095 || 32–32 || L2
|- style="background:#ffbbbb;" 
| 65 || June 13 || @ Cubs (ESPN) || 0–2 || Davies (4–3) || Martínez (3–7) || Kimbrel (18) || 35,225 || 32–33 || L3
|- style="background:#bbffbb;" 
| 66 || June 14 || Marlins || 4–2 || Gallegos (4–1) || Floro (2–4) || Reyes (17) || 24,281 || 33–33 || W1
|- style="background:#bbffbb;" 
| 67 || June 15 || Marlins || 2–1 || Reyes (4–2) || García (3–5) || — || 24,736 || 34–33 || W2
|- style="background:#bbffbb;" 
| 68 || June 16 || Marlins || 1–0 || Helsley (4–4) || Alcántara (4–6) || — || 24,682 || 35–33 || W3
|- style="background:#ffbbbb;"
| 69 || June 17 || @ Braves || 0–4 || Morton (6–3) || Gant (4–5) || — || 33,412 || 35–34 || L1
|- style="background:#ffbbbb;" 
| 70 || June 18 || @ Braves || 1–9 || Fried (4–4) || Martínez (3–8) || — || 40,377 || 35–35 || L2
|- style="background:#bbbbbb;" 
| — || June 19 || @ Braves || colspan=8 | Postponed (rain, makeup June 20)
|- style="background:#bbffbb;" 
| 71 || June 20  || @ Braves || 9–1  || Wainwright (5–5) || Wilson (2–3) || — || 33,781 || 36–35 || W1
|- style="background:#ffbbbb;" 
| 72 || June 20  || @ Braves (ESPN) || 0–1  || Smyly (4–3) || Kim (1–5) || Smith (13) || 36,977 || 36–36 || L1
|- style="background:#ffbbbb;" 
| 73 || June 22 || @ Tigers || 2–8 || Funkhouser (1–0) || Oviedo (0–3) || — || 13,492 || 36–37 || L2
|- style="background:#ffbbbb;" 
| 74 || June 23 || @ Tigers || 2–6 || Manning (1–1) || Gant (4–6) || — || 13,263 || 36–38 || L3
|- style="background:#ffbbbb;"  
| 75 || June 24 || Pirates || 2–8 || Kuhl (2–4) || Martínez (3–9) || — || 33,254 || 36–39 || L4
|- style="background:#ffbbbb;" 
| 76 || June 25 || Pirates || 4–5 || Crowe (1–4) || Woodford (1–1) || Rodríguez (10) || 34,812 || 36–40 || L5
|- style="background:#bbffbb;" 
| 77 || June 26 || Pirates || 3–1 || Wainwright (6–5) || Brubaker (4–7) || Reyes (18) || 33,058 || 37–40 || W1
|- style="background:#ffbbbb;" 
| 78 || June 27 || Pirates || 2–7 || Kranick (1–0) || Oviedo (0–4) || — || 25,163 || 37–41 || L1
|- style="background:#bbffbb;" 
| 79 || June 28 || Diamondbacks || 7–1 || Gallegos (5–1) || Young (2–6) || — || 27,175 || 38–41 || W1
|- style="background:#bbffbb;" 
| 80 || June 29 || Diamondbacks || 3–2 || Martínez (4–9) || Smith (2–4) || Reyes (19) || 28,740 || 39–41 || W2
|- style="background:#bbffbb;" 
| 81 || June 30 || Diamondbacks || 7–4 || Kim (2–5) || Smith (1–4) || Reyes (20) || 27,235 || 40–41 || W3
|-

|- style="background:#ffbbbb;" 
| 82 || July 1 || @ Rockies || 2–5 || Bard (4–4) || Gallegos (5–2) || — || 30,410 || 40–42 || L1
|- style="background:#bbffbb;" 
| 83 || July 2 || @ Rockies || 9–3  || Reyes (5–2) || Almonte (1–2) || — || 47,224 || 41–42 || W1
|- style="background:#ffbbbb;" 
| 84 || July 3 || @ Rockies || 2–3 || Chacín (2–1) || Cabrera (1–3) || Bard (12) || 48,182 || 41–43 || L1
|- style="background:#ffbbbb;" 
| 85 || July 4 || @ Rockies || 2–3 || Lawrence (1–0) || Reyes (5–3) || — || 36,891 || 41–44 || L2
|- style="background:#bbffbb;" 
| 86 || July 5 || @ Giants || 5–3 || Kim (3–5) || Gausman (8–3) || — || 32,644 || 42–44 || W1
|- style="background:#bbffbb;" 
| 87 || July 6 || @ Giants || 6–5 || Wainwright (7–5) || Cueto (6–5) || Miller (1) || 18,785 || 43–44 || W2
|- style="background:#ffbbbb;" 
| 88 || July 7 || @ Giants || 2–5 || Wood (8–3) || Oviedo (0–5) || McGee (17) || 19,067 || 43–45 || L1
|- style="background:#ffbbbb;"
| 89 || July 9 || @ Cubs || 5–10 || Hendricks (11–4) || LeBlanc (0–2) || — || 36,192 || 43–46 || L2
|- style="background:#bbffbb;" 
| 90 || July 10 || @ Cubs || 6–0 || Kim (4–5) || Davies (5–6) || — || 39,368 || 44–46 || W1
|- style="background:#bbbbbb;" 
| — || July 11 || @ Cubs || colspan=8 | Postponed (rain, makeup September 24)
|- style=background:#bbbfff 
|colspan=10|91st All-Star Game in Denver, Colorado
|- style="background:#ffbbbb;" 
| 91 || July 16 || Giants || 2–7 || Jackson (1–0) || Wainwright (7–6) || — || 33,743 || 44–47 || L1
|- style="background:#bbffbb;" 
| 92 || July 17 || Giants || 3–1 || Kim (5–5) || DeSclafani (10–4) || Reyes (21) || 40,489 || 45–47 || W1
|- style="background:#bbffbb;" 
| 93 || July 18 || Giants || 2–1 || Cabrera (2–3) || Brebbia (0–1) || Reyes (22) || 29,425 || 46–47 || W2
|- style="background:#bbffbb;" 
| 94 || July 19 || Cubs || 8–3 || Woodford (2–1) || Mills (4–3) || — || 38,199 || 47–47 || W2
|- style="background:#ffbbbb;" 
| 95 || July 20 || Cubs || 6–7 || Maples (1–0) || Reyes (5–4) || Kimbrel (22) || 35,402 || 47–48 || L1
|- style="background:#bbffbb;" 
| 96 || July 21 || Cubs || 3–2  || McFarland (1–0) || Kimbrel (1–3) || — || 37,008 || 48–48 || L1
|- style="background:#bbffbb;" 
| 97 || July 22 || Cubs || 3–2 || Kim (6–5) || Alzolay (4–10) || Reyes (23) || 41,412 || 49–48 || W1
|- style="background:#ffbbbb;" 
| 98 || July 23 || @ Reds || 5–6 || Brach (1–1) || Gallegos (5–3) || Hembree (7) || 30,605 || 49–49 || L1
|- style="background:#ffbbbb;" 
| 99 || July 24 || @ Reds || 3–5 || Castillo (4–10) || Woodford (2–2) || Hembree (8) || 33,489 || 49–50 || L2
|- style="background:#bbffbb;" 
| 100 || July 25 || @ Reds || 10–6 || Helsley (5–4) || Gray (2–6) || — || 21,947 || 50–50 || W1
|- style="background:#bbffbb;" 
| 101 || July 27 || @ Indians || 4–2 || Wainwright (8–6) || Shaw (3–5) || Reyes (24) || 19,480 || 51–50 || W2
|- style="background:#ffbbbb;" 
| 102 || July 28 || @ Indians || 2–7 || Plesac (6–3) || Kim (6–6) || — || 19,927 || 51–51 || W2
|- style="background:#bbffbb;" 
| 103 || July 30 || Twins || 5–1 || Helsley (6–4) || Duffey (2–3) || — || 34,036 || 52–51 || W3
|- style="background:#ffbbbb;" 
| 104 || July 31 || Twins || 1–8 || Alcalá (3–5) || Woodford (2–3) || — || 33,432 || 52–52 || L1
|-

|- style="background:#bbffbb;" 
| 105 || August 1 || Twins || 7–3 || Wainwright (9–6) || Pineda (4–6) || — || 28,975 || 53–52 || W1
|- style="background:#ffbbbb;" 
| 106 || August 3 || Braves || 1–6 || Fried (8–7) || Lester (3–6) || — || 31,509 || 53–53 || L1
|- style="background:#ffbbbb;" 
| 107 || August 4 || Braves || 4–7 || Martin (1–3) || Gallegos (5–4) || Smith (22) || 32,205 || 53–54 || L2
|- style="background:#ffbbbb;" 
| 108 || August 5 || Braves || 4–8 || Santana (1–0) || Gallegos (5–5) || — || 30,549 || 53–55 || L3
|- style="background:#bbffbb;" 
| 109 || August 6 || Royals || 4–2 || Wainwright (10–6) || Minor (8–10) || Reyes (25) || 29,090 || 54–55 || W1
|- style="background:#bbffbb;" 
| 110 || August 7 || Royals || 5–2 || García (1–0) || Keller (7–11) || Gallegos (2) || 36,615 || 55–55 || W2
|- style="background:#ffbbbb;"
| 111 || August 8 || Royals || 5–6 || Barlow (4–3) || Reyes (5–5) || Lovelady (1) || 31,943 || 55–56 || L1
|- style="background:#bbffbb;" 
| 112 || August 10 || @ Pirates || 4–1 || Happ (6–6) || Brault (0–1) || Reyes (26) || 10,056 || 56–56 || W1
|- style="background:#bbffbb;" 
| 113 || August 11 || @ Pirates || 4–0 || Wainwright (11–6) || Crowe (3–7) || — || 8,548 || 57–56 || W2
|- style="background:#bbffbb;" 
| 114 || August 12 || @ Pirates || 7–6 || McFarland (2–0) || Brubaker (4–12) || Reyes (27) || 8,676 || 58–56 || W3
|- style="background:#bbffbb;"
| 115 || August 13 || @ Royals || 6–0 ||  Flaherty (9–1) || Minor (8–11) || — || 30,620 || 59–56 || W4
|- style="background:#bbffbb;" 
| 116 || August 14 || @ Royals || 9–4 || Lester (4–6) || Keller (7–13) || — || 35,784 || 60–56 || W5
|- style="background:#bbffbb;" 
| 117 || August 15 || @ Royals || 7–2 || Happ (7–6) || Bubic (3–6) || — || 18,317 || 61–56 || W6
|- style="background:#ffbbbb;" 
| 118 || August 17 || Brewers || 0–2 || Burnes (8–4) || Wainwright (11–7) || Hader (24) || 28,058 || 61–57 || L1
|- style="background:#ffbbbb;" 
| 119 || August 18 || Brewers || 4–6  || Hader (4–2) || Reyes (5–6) || Williams (3) || 25,938 || 61–58 || L2
|- style="background:#bbffbb;" 
| 120 || August 19 || Brewers || 8–4 || Fernández (1–0) || Woodruff (7–7) || — || 27,545 || 62–58 || W1
|- style="background:#ffbbbb;" 
| 121 || August 20 || Pirates || 0–4 || Keller (4–10) || Mikolas (0–1) || — || 28,406 || 62–59 || L1
|- style="background:#ffbbbb;"  
| 122 || August 21 || Pirates || 4–5 || Shreve (2–1) || Cabrera (2–4) || Bednar (1) || 30,205 || 62–60 || L2
|- style="background:#bbffbb;" 
| 123 || August 22 || Pirates || 3–0 || Wainwright (12–7) || Brault (0–2) || Reyes (28) || 34,431 || 63–60 || W1
|- style="background:#ffbbbb;" 
| 124 || August 24 || Tigers || 3–4 || Mize (7–6) || Flaherty (9–2) || Fulmer (8) || 28,185 || 63–61 || L1
|- style="background:#bbffbb;"  
| 125 || August 25 || Tigers || 3–2  || McFarland (3–0) || Fulmer (5–6) || — || 24,304 || 64–61 || W1
|- style="background:#ffbbbb;" 
| 126 || August 26 || @ Pirates || 7–11 || Kuhl (4–6) || Cabrera (2–5) || — || 8,618 || 64–62 || L1
|- style="background:#bbffbb;" 
| 127 || August 27 || @ Pirates || 4–3 || Happ (8–6) || Peters (0–2) || Reyes (29) || 12,662 || 65–62 || W1
|- style="background:#bbffbb;" 
| 128 || August 28 || @ Pirates || 13–0 || Wainwright (13–7) || Brault (0–3) || — || 20,043 || 66–62 || W2
|- style="background:#ffbbbb;" 
| 129 || August 29 || @ Pirates || 3–4 || Stratton (5–0) || Reyes (5–7) || — || 10,290 || 66–63 || L1
|- style="background:#bbffbb;" 
| 130 || August 30 || @ Reds || 3–1 || Lester (5–6) || Castillo (7–14) || Gallegos (3) || 10,773 || 67–63 || W1
|- style="background:#bbbbbb;" 
| — || August 31 || @ Reds || colspan=8 | Postponed (rain, makeup September 1)
|-

|- style="background:#bbffbb;" 
| 131 ||  September 1  || @ Reds || 5–4  || Cabrera (3–5) || Miley (11–5) || Gallegos (4) || 10,365 || 68–63 || W2
|- style="background:#ffbbbb;" 
| 132 ||  September 1  || @ Reds || 2–12  || Gray (7–6) || Happ (8–7) || — || 10,892 || 68–64 || L1
|- style="background:#bbffbb;" 
| 133 || September 3 || @ Brewers || 15–4 || Wainwright (14–7) || Peralta (9–4) || — || 23,987 || 69–64 || W1
|- style="background:#ffbbbb;" 
| 134 || September 4 || @ Brewers || 0–4 || Houser (8–6) || Kim (6–7) || — || 33,439 || 69–65 || L1
|- style="background:#ffbbbb;" 
| 135 || September 5 || @ Brewers || 5–6 || Sánchez (2–0) || Reyes (5–8) || — || 33,845 || 69–66 || L2
|- style="background:#ffbbbb;" 
| 136 || September 6 || Dodgers || 1–5 || Scherzer (13–4) || Mikolas (0–2) || — || 43,575 || 69–67 || L3
|- style="background:#ffbbbb;" 
| 137 || September 7 || Dodgers || 2–7 || Vesia (3–1) || Happ (8–8) || — || 34,500 || 69–68 || L4
|- style="background:#bbffbb;" 
| 138 || September 8 || Dodgers || 5–4 || Wainwright (15–7) || White (1–3) || Gallegos (5) || 35,566 || 70–68 || W1
|- style="background:#bbffbb;" 
| 139 || September 9 || Dodgers || 2–1 || Reyes (6–8) || Bickford (3–2) || Gallegos (6) || 31,173 || 71–68 || W2
|- style="background:#ffbbbb;" 
| 140 ||  September 10 || Reds || 2–4 || Lorenzen (1–2) || McFarland (3–1) || Givens (7) || 29,597 || 71–69 || L1
|- style="background:#bbffbb;" 
| 141 || September 11 || Reds || 6–4 || Reyes (7–8) || Sims (5–3) || Gallegos (7) || 33,404 || 72–69 || W1
|- style="background:#bbffbb;" 
| 142 || September 12 || Reds || 2–0 || Happ (9–8) || Gray (7–7) || Gallegos (8) || 32,872 || 73–69 || W2
|- style="background:#bbffbb;" 
| 143 || September 13 || @ Mets || 7–0 || Wainwright (16–7) || Hill (6–7) || — || 19,057 || 74–69 || W3
|- style="background:#bbffbb;" 
| 144 || September 14 || @ Mets || 7–6  || Reyes (8–8) || Reed (0–1) || Kim (1) || 21,825 || 75–69 || W4
|- style="background:#bbffbb;" 
| 145 || September 15 || @ Mets || 11–4 || Lester (6–6) || Megill (3–5) || — || 21,001 || 76–69 || W5
|- style="background:#bbffbb;" 
| 146 || September 17 || Padres || 8–2 || Mikolas (1–2) || Velasquez (3–7) || — || 30,937 || 77–69 || W6
|- style="background:#bbffbb;" 
| 147 || September 18 || Padres || 3–2 || Miller (1–0) || Pagán (4–2) || Gallegos (9) || 40,626 || 78–69 || W7
|- style="background:#bbffbb;" 
| 148 || September 19 || Padres || 8–7 || Reyes (9–8) || Arrieta (5–14) || Gallegos (10) || 35,326 || 79–69 || W8
|- style="background:#bbffbb;"  
| 149 || September 20 || @ Brewers || 5–2 || Lester (7–6) || Peralta (9–5) || García (1) || 28,291 || 80–69 || W9
|- style="background:#bbffbb;"
| 150 || September 21 || @ Brewers || 2–1 || Woodford (3–3) || Woodruff (9–10) || Gallegos (11) || 30,475 || 81–69 || W10
|- style="background:#bbffbb;"
| 151 || September 22 || @ Brewers || 10–2 || Mikolas (2–2) || Anderson (4–9) || — || 29,635 || 82–69 || W11
|- style="background:#bbffbb;"  
| 152 || September 23 || @ Brewers || 8–5 || McFarland (4–1) || Ashby (3–1) || Gallegos (12) || 30,804 || 83–69 || W12
|- style="background:#bbffbb;"
| 153 || September 24  || @ Cubs || 8–5  || Reyes (10–8) || Steele (3–4) || Gallegos (13) || 29,030 || 84–69 || W13
|- style="background:#bbffbb;"
| 154 || September 24  || @ Cubs || 12–4  || Hudson (1–0) || Davies (6–12) || — || 35,020 || 85–69 || W14
|- style="background:#bbffbb;" 
| 155 || September 25 || @ Cubs || 8–5 || Kim (7–7) || Heuer (7–3) || — || 32,918 || 86–69 || W15
|- style="background:#bbffbb;" 
| 156 || September 26 || @ Cubs || 4–2 || Cabrera (4–5) || Heuer (7–4) || Gallegos (14) || 26,547 || 87–69 || W16
|- style="background:#bbffbb;"
| 157 || September 28 || Brewers || 6–2 || Wainwright (17–7) || Gustave (1–1) || — || 35,726 || 88–69 || W17
|- style="background:#ffbbbb;" 
| 158 || September 29 || Brewers || 0–4 || Houser (10–6) || Mikolas (2–3) || — || 35,283 || 88–70 || L1
|- style="background:#bbffbb;" 
| 159 || September 30 || Brewers || 4–3 || Happ (10–8) || Sánchez (2–1) || García (2) || 29,161 || 89–70 || W1
|-

|- style="background:#bbffbb;" 
| 160 || October 1 || Cubs || 4–3 || Gallegos (6–5) || Nance (1–1) || — || 41,618 || 90–70 || W2
|- style="background:#ffbbbb;" 
| 161 || October 2 || Cubs (Fox) || 5–6 || Adam (1–0) || García (1–1) || Wick (5) || 45,239 || 90–71 || L1
|- style="background:#ffbbbb;" 
| 162 || October 3 || Cubs || 2–3  || Biagini (1–0) || Woodford (3–4) || — || 46,525 || 90–72 || L2
|-

|- style="text-align:center;"
| Legend:       = Win       = Loss       = PostponementBold = Cardinals team member

Awards 
The Cardinals became the first team to have five players win Gold Glove Awards: first baseman Paul Goldschmidt, second baseman Tommy Edman, third baseman Nolan Arenado, left fielder Tyler O'Neill and center fielder Harrison Bader.

Winning streak 
In September, the Cardinals went on a franchise record 17-game winning streak. The streak started with two wins in St. Louis against the Cincinnati Reds, followed by three-game sweeps of the New York Mets and San Diego Padres, and continued with four-game sweeps of the Milwaukee Brewers and Chicago Cubs. The Cardinals won their 17th consecutive game in St. Louis against Milwaukee, marking the longest win streak in the National League since 1937 and longest in the MLB since the 2017 Cleveland Indians. The streak, which began on September 11, came to an end on September 29 with a 4–0 loss to the Brewers. The 17 straight wins for the Cardinals broke the previous franchise record of 14 consecutive wins in 1935. This 17-game stretch vaulted the Cardinals into a commanding lead in the NL Wild Card race, and helped them reach the 2021 MLB playoffs.

Gold Gloves 
On defense, the Cardinals were the first team in MLB history to win five Gold Glove Awards. The five National League Gold Glove winners for the Cardinals were first baseman Paul Goldschmidt, second baseman Tommy Edman, third baseman Nolan Arenado, center fielder Harrison Bader, and left fielder Tyler O'Neill. Arenado won his fifth National League Platinum Glove Award in a row and first as a Cardinal, which is given to the best fielder in each respective league.

Rookie of the Year 
St. Louis outfielder, Dylan Carlson was a nominee for the 2021 National League Rookie of the Year Award. Carlson finished third in votes for the NL Rookie of Year, behind Trevor Rogers of the Miami Marlins and Jonathan India of the Cincinnati Reds. India won the Rookie of Year, playing infield for a division rival of the Cardinals. In his first full season with the team, Carlson played in 149 games and hit for an average of .266 with 18 home runs.

Manager of the Year 
Cardinal manager, Mike Shildt, was named a finalist for the 2021 National League Manager of the Year Award. Shildt received one first-place vote, and finished third overall behind San Francisco Giants manager, Gabe Kapler, and Craig Counsell of the Milwaukee Brewers. Kapler, who won the award, led his team to the best record in the MLB, while Counsell's Brewers won the NL Central division over the Cardinals. Shildt managed the Cardinals to a 90–72 record and playoff berth. This was Shildt's second nomination for NL Manager of the Year, having won the award in 2019.

Roster

Postseason

Game log

|- style=background:#ffbbbb;"
| 1 || October 6 || @ Dodgers || 1–3 || Jansen (1–0) || McFarland (0–1) || — || 53,193 || 0–1
|-

Postseason rosters

| style="text-align:left" |
Pitchers: 21 Andrew Miller 22 Jack Flaherty 29 Alex Reyes 33 Kwang Hyun Kim 38 Kodi Whitley 39 Miles Mikolas 43 Dakota Hudson 50 Adam Wainwright 62 T. J. McFarland 65 Giovanny Gallegos 66 Luis García 92 Génesis Cabrera
Catchers: 4 Yadier Molina 7 Andrew Knizner
Infielders: 11 Paul DeJong 13 Matt Carpenter 19 Tommy Edman 28 Nolan Arenado 46 Paul Goldschmidt 63 Edmundo Sosa 64 José Rondón 77 Juan Yepez
Outfielders: 3 Dylan Carlson 27 Tyler O'Neill 48 Harrison Bader 68 Lars Nootbaar
|- valign="top"

Minor league system and first-year player draft

Teams

Major League Baseball draft

The 2021 Major League Baseball (MLB) First-Year Player Draft began on Sunday, July 11, and ended on Tuesday, July 13. The draft assigned amateur baseball players to MLB teams.

2021 Draft Order

2021 Draft Tracker (StL Cardinals)

References

External links
St. Louis Cardinals 2021 schedule at MLB.com
2021 St. Louis Cardinals at ESPN
2021 St. Louis Cardinals season at Baseball Reference

St. Louis Cardinals seasons
St. Louis Cardinals
St. Louis Cardinals